Promises Kept may refer to:

 Promises Kept (Champion album), 2004
 Promises Kept (Steve Kuhn album), 2004
 Promises Kept (The Supremes album), an unreleased album from 1971
 Promises Kept, a 2003 autobiography by Sid McMath
 "Promises Kept" (Arrow), an episode of Arrow